Péter Disztl (born 30 March 1960) is a Hungarian retired footballer who played as a goalkeeper.

Club career
Born in Baja, Disztl's main club was Videoton FC, and he was one of the side's top performers as it made it to the 1984–85 UEFA Cup final, in an eventual 1–3 aggregate loss against Real Madrid; after a 0–3 home loss, he saved a penalty from Jorge Valdano in the opening minutes of the second leg at the Santiago Bernabéu, being crucial to secure the consolation win.

After two seasons in Germany, the first in the final year of the former German Democratic Republic league in the already reunified country, the second in second division, and one in Malaysia, Disztl returned home, closing out his career in 1997 after short spells with six teams.

International career
Disztl made his debut for the Hungarian national team in 1984, and won a further 36 caps in the following five years. He was a participant at the 1986 FIFA World Cup in Mexico, where the country failed to progress from the group stage.

After his retirement, Disztl was charged for some years with the coaching of the national side's goalkeepers.

References

External links

1960 births
Living people
People from Baja, Hungary
Hungarian people of German descent
Hungarian footballers
Association football goalkeepers
Nemzeti Bajnokság I players
Fehérvár FC players
Budapest Honvéd FC players
Pécsi MFC players
Győri ETO FC players
DDR-Oberliga players
2. Bundesliga players
FC Rot-Weiß Erfurt players
1. FC Lokomotive Leipzig players
Selangor FA players
Hungary international footballers
1986 FIFA World Cup players
Hungarian expatriate footballers
Expatriate footballers in East Germany
Expatriate footballers in Germany
Expatriate footballers in Malaysia
Veszprém LC footballers
Sportspeople from Bács-Kiskun County